Vitali Viktorovich Nikulkin (born 31 July 1971) is a former Russian professional footballer.

Club career
He made his professional debut in the Soviet Second League in 1989 for FC Svetotekhnika Saransk. He played 1 game in the UEFA Cup 1993–94 for FC Lokomotiv Moscow.

Honours
Russian Premier League bronze: 1994.
Most league goals in FC Mordovia Saransk history: 110.

References

1971 births
Living people
People from Saransk
Soviet footballers
Russian footballers
Association football forwards
Association football midfielders
FC Mordovia Saransk players
FC Lokomotiv Moscow players
FC Lokomotiv Nizhny Novgorod players
Russian Premier League players
Sportspeople from Mordovia